Tjøme Radio is a coast radio station in Horten, Norway. Operated by Telenor Maritim Radio, it has the responsibility for Skagerrak coast between Søgne and the Norway–Sweden border. It also covers the lake Mjøsa. Established in 1905 by the Royal Norwegian Navy, it became a civilian installation five years later. The station was located in Tjøme until 2008.

References

Coast radio stations in Norway
Horten
Tjøme
1905 establishments in Norway